Le Mesnil-Patry is a former commune in the Calvados department in the Normandy region in northwestern France. On 1 January 2017, it was merged into the new commune Thue et Mue.

History

World War II
On 11 June 1944 the Battle of Le Mesnil-Patry was fought to the east of the town, involving units of the 12th SS Panzer Division, 3rd Canadian Infantry Division and 2nd Canadian Armoured Brigade.

Population

See also
Communes of the Calvados department

References

Former communes of Calvados (department)
Calvados communes articles needing translation from French Wikipedia